Margaret Polley (died July 1555) was an English Protestant martyr from Popingberry, Rochester, Kent. Her story is recorded in Foxe's Book of Martyrs.

She was questioned by Maurice Griffith, Bishop of Rochester, condemned to death for heresy, and imprisoned for over a month. John Foxe wrote that Polley:
 "was in the prime of her life, pious, charitable, humane, learned in the Scriptures, and beloved by all who knew her." 

She was executed in Tunbridge in July 1555, on the same day as Christopher Wade.

References

1555 deaths
16th-century Protestant martyrs
16th-century  English women
Executed English women
Executed British people
People executed for heresy
People executed under Mary I of England
People from Pembury
People executed by the Kingdom of England by burning
Executed people from Kent
Year of birth unknown
Protestant martyrs of England